{{The 2010 South East Asian Table Tennis Championships were held in Makati, Metro Manila, Philippines from 12 to 15 December 2010.

Medal summary

Medal table

Missing

Events

Missing

See also
Asian Table Tennis Union
Asian Table Tennis Championships

References

South East Asian Table Tennis Championships
South East Asian Table Tennis Championships
South East Asian Table Tennis Championships
Table Tennis Championships
Table tennis competitions in the Philippines
International sports competitions hosted by the Philippines
South East Asian Table Tennis Championships